Tambovsky is a rural locality (a settlement) in Tolstovsky Selsoviet, Kamensky District, Altai Krai, Russia. The population was 108 as of 2013. There is 1 street.

Geography 
Tambovsky is located 40 km southwest of Kamen-na-Obi (the district's administrative centre) by road. Tolstovsky is the nearest rural locality.

References 

Rural localities in Kamensky District, Altai Krai